CRTF may refer to:

 Demethylspheroidene O-methyltransferase, an enzyme
 Coral reef organizations, U.S. Coral Reef Task Force